Río Colorado is a town and municipality in the Río Negro Province of Argentina. It is the administrative centre of the Pichi Mahuida Department.

Population

Climate
Río Colorado has a semi-arid climate (Köppen climate classification BSk). Cloudy days are common during winter, averaging 7–8 days from June to August. Precipitation is low, averaging  which is fairly evenly distributed throughout the year. Rio Colorado averages about 2,683.8 hours of bright sunshine per year (approximately 7.4 hours of sunshine per day) or about 58.7% of possible sunshine ranging from a high of 71.5% in February to a low of only 38.0% in June.

References

Notes

Populated places in Río Negro Province